The discography of South Korean singer, dancer and choreographer Chungha consists of two studio albums, four extended plays (EPs), three single albums, seventeen singles, and forty-four music videos. In addition, the singer has collaborative and soundtracks for television series.

Studio albums

Extended plays

Single albums

Singles

As lead artist

As featured artist

Collaborations

Soundtrack appearances

Other charted songs

Other appearances

Music video appearances

Music videos

Songwriting credits

See also
 I.O.I discography
 List of songs recorded by Chungha

Notes

References

Discographies of South Korean artists
K-pop discographies